USS LST-943 was an  in the United States Navy. Like many of her class, she was not named and is properly referred to by her hull designation.

Construction
LST-943 was laid down on 8 August 1944, at Hingham, Massachusetts, by the Bethlehem-Hingham Shipyard; launched on 9 September 1944; sponsored by Miss Margaret Clarke; and commissioned on 30 September 1944.

Service history
During World War II LST-943 was assigned to the Asiatic-Pacific theater and participated in the assault and occupation of Iwo Jima in February 1945, and the assault and occupation of Okinawa Gunto in April 1945.

Following the war, she performed occupation duty in the Far East until mid-April 1946. She returned to the United States and was decommissioned on 16 July 1946, and struck from the Navy list on 25 September, that same year. On 4 November 1947, the ship was sold to the Moore Drydock Co., of Oakland, California, for scrapping.

Awards
LST-943 earned two battle star for World War II service.

Notes

Citations

Bibliography 

Online resources

External links
 

 

1944 ships
LST-542-class tank landing ships
Ships built in Hingham, Massachusetts
World War II amphibious warfare vessels of the United States